St. Mary's Catholic Church is a red brick, Italianate Romanesque Revival building designed by Tourtellotte and Hummel and constructed by H.J. McNeel in 1925 in Caldwell, Idaho. The church features an 80-ft tower, and the building was added to the National Register of Historic Places in 1982.

Originally intended as the Church of the Immaculate Conception, the building was known as St. Mary's Catholic Church by 1930 or earlier. 

The church was designed to seat a congregation of 300 persons, and it remained in service as a Catholic building until 2003, when larger Our Lady of the Valley Catholic Church opened in Caldwell.

References

External links

		
National Register of Historic Places in Canyon County, Idaho
Churches completed in 1937
Caldwell, Idaho
Former churches in Idaho